The Corn Exchange is a 400-seat arts centre in Newbury, Berkshire, UK. It presents a varied programme including dance, film, music, drama, children's events, comedy and an annual pantomime.

History
The building was originally a corn exchange which opened for trade in 1862, but after the decline in corn trading it was used for public meetings; in 1993 it was opened as an arts centre after a £3.5 million refurbishment. The building is now a Grade II listed building. On 1 June 2000 the operation of The Corn Exchange passed from West Berkshire Council to The Corn Exchange (Newbury) Trust, an independent charity, which also manages New Greenham Arts (an arts centre based at Greenham Common).

In 1966 the band The Who were performing, when Keith Moon and John Entwistle came in late to a performance to see bandmates Pete Townshend and Roger Daltrey playing with members of a support act. The resulting punch-up left Moon with a black eye and a broken ankle.

In 2004 The Corn Exchange produced the first Newbury Comedy Festival, which featured Linda Smith, the Comedy Store Players, comedy films, David Benson's Think No Evil of Us: My Life With Kenneth Williams, Population:3's The Wicker Woman, Tina C, Orchestra Southern Sinfonia, providing live accompaniment to Buster Keaton's Our Hospitality, Laughter Yoga, Arabella Weir, Ken Campbell, Paul Foot, Al Murray: The Pub Landlord, Mel & Sue, Peepolykus and Natalie Haynes.  It also saw the launch of the annual comedy competition "You Must be Joking".

In the following years the festival has played host to Emo Philips, Jimmy Carr, Jo Brand, Russell Brand, Gervase Phinn, Simon Munnery, Lee Mack, Janet Street Porter, Jenny Éclair, Alex Horne, Robin Ince, Rich Hall, Chris Addison, Alan Carr, Brendan Burns, Push - an Opera about Childbirth, Wil Hodgson, Laura Solon, Barry Cryer and more.

Recently the organisation has increasingly supported the development of new work by emerging artists - through the subsidised visual arts studios at New Greenham Arts, the Arts Council funded Cultivating Ideas project, and by being more closely associated with commissioning and production.

Supported artists include Barb Jungr, Curious, Plested & Brown, Unlimited Theatre, Northern Stage, David Leddy, Cassie Friend, Company FZ, Mervyn Miller, Biserk Dance, Motionhouse, Angela de Castro and Lyndsey Butcher.

In 2006, the Corn Exchange undertook its first national tour, a new production directed by Chris Goode, Longwave.

References

External links

1861 establishments in England
Arts centres in England
Grade II listed buildings in Berkshire
Buildings and structures in Newbury, Berkshire
Theatres in Berkshire